Hagit Shatkay (28 January 1965 - 2 January 2022) was an Israeli-American computer scientist, known for her contributions to computational biology, medical informatics, bioinformatics, and machine learning. She was a professor in the department of computer and information sciences at the University of Delaware. Shatkay was a senior member and served on the board of directors of the International Society for Computational Biology.

Career
Shatkay received her bachelor’s and master’s degrees in computer science from The Hebrew University of Jerusalem, Israel. She earned her doctoral degree in computer science from Brown University in 1999, under Leslie Kaelbling. From 1999 to 2000, she served as a postdoctoral fellow at the National Center for Biotechnology Information. From 2001 to 2003, she spent two years as a private-sector informatics research scientist at  Celera Genomics. She returned to academia and worked as an assistant professor at Queen's University at Kingston in 2004. She joined the department of computer and information sciences at the University of Delaware as an associate professor in fall 2010. She was promoted to full professor at the University of Delaware in 2018.

Together with Mark Craven (University of Wisconsin), she co-authored the textbook Mining the Biomedical Literature.

Shatkay was a senior member of the International Society for Computational Biology, ISCB. She was also an appointed member of the Computer Science Evaluation Panel of the Natural Sciences and Engineering Research Council of Canada (NSERC).

References

External links 
 STUDYING THE VIRUS IN REAL TIME
 SHEDDING LIGHT ON DARK MATTER
 UD GRAD STUDENT PICKED FOR PRESTIGIOUS INTERNATIONAL FORUM
 SEARCHING FOR THE BIG PICTURE
 COMPUTER SCIENCE HONORS
 Computer scientist developing predictive models for diagnosing heart disease
 BIG DATA, BETTER HEALTH CARE

University of Delaware faculty
Hebrew University of Jerusalem alumni
Academic staff of Queen's University at Kingston

1965 births
2022 deaths

Israeli emigrants to the United States
American women computer scientists
Brown University alumni